Leonard H. Lesko (born 1938) was Chairman of the Department of Egyptology at Brown University and held the Charles Edwin Wilbour Professorship. In 1961, he received a B.A. in Classics from Loyola University Chicago, and his masters in 1964. In 1969, he received a Ph.D. in "Near Eastern Languages and Civilizations-Egyptology" at the University of Chicago. Prior to joining the Brown faculty in 1982, he held various teaching positions at University of California-Berkeley.

Lesko is an expert in Egyptian languages including Old, Middle, and Late Egyptian, Demotic, and Coptic. He has also studied the Coffin Texts, the Book of the Dead and Deir el-Medina. Along with his wife, Barbara Lesko, he edited A Dictionary of Late Egyptian.

Publications
 King Tut's Wine Cellar (1977))
 Egyptological Studies in Honor of Richard A. Parker: Presented on the Occasion of His 78th Birthday (editor) (1986)
 A Dictionary of Late Egyptian (1990)
  The ancient Egyptian Book of two ways published 1977
 Ancient Egyptian and Mediterranean Studies in Memory of William A. Ward
 Exodus: The Egyptian Evidence-by Brown University, Ernest S. Frerichs, William G. Dever, Leonard H. Lesko
 Index of the Spells on Egyptian Middle Kingdom Coffins and Related Documents
 Joseph Lindon Smith: Paintings from Egypt - An Exhibition, Brown University, October 8-November 21, 1998 Barbara S. Lesko, Diana W. Larkin, Joseph Lindon Smith, Brown University Dept. of Egyptology
 Pharaoh's Workers: The Villagers of Deir el Medina
 Religion in Ancient Egypt : Gods, Myths, and Personal Practice
 Through A Glass Darkly: Magic, Dreams and Prophecy in Ancient Egypt

See also
 Richard Anthony Parker

References

External links
 Brown University page
 Richard N. Ostling article on Lesko
Leonard Lesko by Matt Lutgen

1938 births
Living people
American Egyptologists
Loyola University Chicago alumni
University of Chicago alumni
University of California, Berkeley faculty
Brown University faculty